The Indore Monorail is a rapid transit line proposed for the city of Indore, India. The state government is conducting a feasibility study with the help of Delhi Metro. The expected cost of laying the railway line in the city will be around 125-150 crore per km. The Municipal Corporation and Indore Development Authority (IDA) are seeking help of Larsen & Toubro (L&T) officials in relation to conceptualise the possibilities of introducing the monorail in the city.
 
The status of the monorail project is unclear as rail technology may be used instead.  In 2021 construction was begun on the first of six lines of the Indore Metro, using railway technology.

See also
 лох Metro

References

Proposed monorails in India
Transport in Indore